The Undley bracteate is a 5th-century bracteate found in Undley Common, near Lakenheath, Suffolk. It bears the earliest known inscription that can be argued to be in Anglo-Frisian Futhorc (as opposed to Common Germanic Elder Futhark).

The image on the bracteate is an adaptation of an Urbs Roma coin type issued by Constantine the Great, conflating the helmeted head of the emperor and the image of Romulus and Remus suckled by the she-wolf on one face. With a diameter of 2.3 cm, it weighs 2.24 grams. It may have originated in northern Germany or southern Scandinavia and been brought to England with an early Anglo-Saxon settler.
 
The inscription reads right to left around the circumference of the obverse side, terminating at the image of the wolf:

ᚷ‍ᚫᚷ‍ᚩᚷ‍ᚫ ᛗᚫᚷᚫ ᛗᛖᛞᚢ
g͡æg͡og͡æ mægæ medu

The o is the earliest known instance of the os rune  contrasting with the æsc rune . The three syllables of the initial word gægogæ are written as bind runes, with side-twigs attached to the X shape of the gyfu rune to represent the vowels æ and o.

The words mægæ medu are interpreted as meaning "meed for the kinsmen", i.e. "reward for relatives", referring to the bracteate itself. The word gægogæ appears to be some magical invocation or battle cry, comparable to the g͡ag͡ag͡a on the Kragehul I lance-shaft.

References
J. Hines and B. Odenstedt, The Undley bracteate and its runic inscription, Studien zur Sachsenforschungen, 6 (1987), pp. 73–94.
J. Hines, The Scandinavian character of Anglian England in the pre-Viking period, BAR British Series 124 (Oxford, 1984), pp. 204–9.
S. E. West, Gold bracteate from Undley, Suffolk, Frühmittelalterliche Studien, 17 (1983), p. 459.

Notes

External links
Gold bracteate at the British Museum

Bracteates
Individual items of jewellery
Medieval European objects in the British Museum
Runic inscriptions
Anglo-Saxon runes
Anglo-Saxon art
She-wolf (Roman mythology)
Ancient Roman jewellery